The Rural Municipality of Lakeshore is a rural municipality (RM) in the Parkland Region of Manitoba, Canada.

Lakeshore is named for the proximity of the shoreline of Dauphin Lake, which splits the municipality into north and south. The RM is anchored on its south end by the Rainbow Beach Provincial Park on Dauphin Lake, and on its north end by Manipogo Provincial Park on Lake Manitoba.

History

The RM was incorporated on January 1, 2015 via the amalgamation of the RMs of Ochre River and Lawrence. It was formed as a requirement of The Municipal Amalgamations Act, which required that municipalities with a population less than 1,000 amalgamate with one or more neighbouring municipalities by 2015. The Government of Manitoba initiated these amalgamations in order for municipalities to meet the 1997 minimum population requirement of 1,000 to incorporate a municipality.

Communities
Constituent communities of the Rural Municipality of Lakeshore include:
Ochre River
Rorketon

 East Bay
 Freedale
 Magnet
 Makinak
 Methley
 Million
 Moose Bay
 Toutes Aides
 Weiden

Demographics 

References 

Rural municipalities in Manitoba
2015 establishments in Manitoba
Manitoba municipal amalgamations, 2015
Populated places established in 2015